Ishta-deva or ishta devata (Sanskrit: इष्ट देव(ता), literally "cherished divinity" from iṣṭa, "personal, liked, cherished, preferred" and devatā, "godhead, divinity, tutelary deity" or deva, "deity"), is a term used in Hinduism denoting a worshipper's favourite deity.

It is especially significant to both the Smarta and Bhakti schools, wherein practitioners choose to worship the form of God that inspires them. Within Smartism, one of five chief deities is selected. Even in denominations that focus on a singular concept of God, such as Vaishnavism, the ishta-deva concept exists. For example, in Vaishnavism, special focus is given to a particular form of Vishnu or one of his avataras (i.e. Krishna or Rama). Similarly within Shaktism, focus is given to a particular form of the Goddess such as Parvati or Lakshmi. The Swaminarayan sect of Vaishnavism has a similar concept, but notably holds that Vishnu and Shiva are different aspects of the same God.

Smarta worship
The "worship of the five forms" system, which was popularized by philosopher Adi Shankara among orthodox Brahmins of the Smārta tradition, invokes the five deities Ganesha, Vishnu, Shiva, Shakti, and Sūrya.  This system was instituted by  primarily to unite the principal deities of the five major sects on an equal status. The monistic philosophy preached by  made it possible to choose one of these as a preferred principal deity and at the same time worship the other four deities as different forms of the same all-pervading Brahman.

Worship forms

Typically a practitioner worships their Ishta-Deva through the form of a murti. This worship may involve offering items to their chosen divinity such as incense or flowers, reciting mantras, singing their names and offering prayers.

Remembering the deity and internally building a relationship with (or through) them is considered essential to the practise. Within the Advaita schools it is believed that the human mind needs a concrete form to understand the divine that ultimately can never be defined. Just as one can understand the abstract concept of a color only after one has seen a concrete form, one can only realize the deity through a form of murti. In contrast, the Dvaita schools believe the Supreme Being to possess a divine form, and offer worship to their Ishta-Deva as either a representation or direct expansion of the Supreme Person. For example, Vaishnava schools offer worship exclusively to murtis of Vishnu, or his associated avatars such as Krishna or Rama.

Shaivites worship Shiva, either figuratively, or through his Lingam murti. As Shaivism contains both monistic and dualistic traditions either (or both) of the above approaches may be applicable.

See also

Bhakti
Bhakti Yoga
Henotheism
Henotheistic aspects of Hinduism
Icon
Kuldevta
Patron saint
Smartism
Vedanta
Yidam

References

External links
 The Significance of the Hindu Doctrine of Ishtadeva by Anantand Rambachan

Hindu philosophical concepts
Hindu deities
Tutelary deities